Brière is the marsh area to the north of the Loire estuary in France at its mouth on the Atlantic Ocean. The residents of Brière are called Briérons. The Brière marsh area includes a vast area of humid zones stretching from the Gulf of Morbihan and the estuary of the Vilaine to the north, to the salt marshes of Guérande to the west to the estuary of the Loire and the Lac de Grand-Lieu in the south. Peat used to be harvested here.

It is rich in flora and fauna, and navigation is possible with boats called chalands.

Cottages are a common sight in the area, with around 3000 thatched roof cottages dotted throughout the area.

Alphonse de Chateaubriant's prize-winning novel La Brière (translated as Passion and Peat), 1923, is set in the area and describes its traditions and culture.

It has been suggested that the small islands of the Brière, now joined by silt, could have been the location of the Cassiterides - islands mentioned in antiquity as the Phoenician source of tin.

Communes of Brière 

The following communes are found in Brière
 La Chapelle-des-Marais
 Crossac
 Montoir-de-Bretagne
 Saint-André-des-Eaux, Loire-Atlantique
 Saint-Joachim (the commune covering most of la Grande Brière)
 Saint-Lyphard
 Saint-Malo-de-Guersac
 Saint-Nazaire
 Sainte-Reine-de-Bretagne
 Trignac

Traditionally, 21 communes are considered part of Brière (source : , pdf file) :
 La Baule-Escoublac
 Besné
 La Chapelle-des-Marais
 La Chapelle-Launay
 Crossac
 Donges
 Guérande
 Herbignac
 Missillac
 Montoir-de-Bretagne
 Prinquiau
 Pontchâteau
 Pornichet
 Saint-André-des-Eaux
 Saint-Joachim
 Saint-Lyphard
 Saint-Malo-de-Guersac
 Saint-Nazaire
 Sainte-Reine-de-Bretagne
 Trignac
 La Turballe

The Brière Regional Natural Park encompasses 17 communes (source: , pdf file)
 Assérac
 La Baule-Escoublac
 La Chapelle-des-Marais
 Crossac
 Donges
 Guérande
 Herbignac
 Missillac
 Montoir-de-Bretagne
 Saint-André-des-Eaux
 Saint-Joachim
 Saint-Lyphard
 Saint-Malo-de-Guersac
 Saint-Molf
 Saint-Nazaire
 Sainte-Reine-de-Bretagne
 Trignac

See also
La Baule - Guérande Peninsula

References

External links
tourist information

Marshes of France
Ramsar sites in Metropolitan France
Landforms of Brittany